Toulépleu Department is a department of Cavally Region in Montagnes District, Ivory Coast. In 2021, its population was 93,529 and its seat is the settlement of Toulépleu. The sub-prefectures of the department are Bakoubli, Méo, Nézobly, Péhé, Tiobly, and Toulépleu. It is the westernmost department of Ivory Coast.

History
Toulépleu Department was created in 1998 as a second-level subdivision via a split-off from Guiglo Department. At its creation, it was part of Dix-Huit Montagnes Region. In 2000, Toulépleu Department was transferred to the newly created Moyen-Cavally Region.

In 2011, districts were introduced as new first-level subdivisions of Ivory Coast. At the same time, regions were reorganised and became second-level subdivisions and all departments were converted into third-level subdivisions. At this time, Toulépleu Department became part of Cavally Region in Montagnes District.

Notes

Departments of Cavally Region
1998 establishments in Ivory Coast
States and territories established in 1998